Almond CHU (Chinese 朱德華) (born 1962 in Hong Kong, China) is a Hong Kong-based artist and photographer, known for his black and white photographs and large format conceptual color images.

Early life and education
Almond Chu was the eldest son of his family. When he was a kid, he received a camera as gift from his father and it explored his vision through the lens. Almond found his interest in visual arts when he was a teenager. He started his studies on oil painting but gave up finally when he discovered that he just learned a western technique without any spiritual enrichment.

In 1983, he went to Tokyo and continued his studies in fine-art photography at the Tokyo College of Photography. The most influential person for him was his Japanese teacher Iizawa Kôrarô, who is recognized as a leading expert among Japanese photography critics. His studies and the living style there not only fulfilled his persuasion of artistic nourishment, but also led him to practice the spirit of ‘simplicity’.

Career and style

In 1993, he was awarded Agfa Fellowship Young Photographer Award by Asian Culture Council and stayed in New York. At the same year, he set up his own studio in Hong Kong and started his work on art and commercial projects.

He has been invited to exhibit his work in various countries such as Germany, Italy, Denmark, Canada, Russia, Japan, China, Hong Kong, Singapore and New Zealand. Besides, his work has been featured in numerous international publications.
In 2004, he was invited to be one of the prominent speakers of the Internationally Literary and Aesthetic Symposium organized by Bonn University and the Art & Exhibition Hall of Deutschland, Germany. In 2005, he founded the art photography organization pH5 Photo Group which focused in promoting art photography in Hong Kong. In 2007, he founded the art photography magazine pHi and was appointed as the editor-in-chief.

In addition to fine art photography, Almond is also a curator. In 2011, he was invited to be one of the major curators for the large-scale photo exhibition titled “Different Dimension - the International Festival of contemporary photography” at Novosibirsk State Art Museum in Russia.

Parade
Before the end of 2000, Almond was known by his black and white photographs and his dark room technique. In the years after, he started his conceptual series Parade and adapted digital technique to edit and enhance his work so as to achieve the surreal phenomenon.
The series stages imaginary parades, formed in fact of repetitions of a single individual, always taking place in historically and socially symbolical places, such as the government offices or the Apple store. Since 1997, Almond Chu had developed this series and his gallerist in Hong-Kong La Galerie encouraged him to continue this historical and existential work of testimony.

Selected solo exhibitions

Selected group exhibitions

Public and private collectors

Residencies
 Akademie Schloss Solitude, Stuttgart, Germany 2003
 Asian Cultural Council, New York, USA 1993

Books
 The Urbanites Almond Chu, published by MCCM Creations 2013, Hong Kong, 
 Almond Chu Asian Artists Portrait, a handmade photo album specially for Asia Art Archive Collection, Hong Kong
 Hong Kong/China Photographers Three Almond Chu by Wolfgang Kubin, published by Asia One Products & Publishing Ltd 2009, Hong Kong, 
 Horse, limited edition handmade portfolio by Asia One Products & Publishing Ltd, Hong Kong

Publications
 The No Colours, published by Hatjie Cantz Verlag 2014, Germany
 13th China Pingyao International Photography Festival, published by China Photographic Publishing House 2013, Beijing, China
 The 5th Dali International Photography Festival, published by China Tushu Publishing Ltd 2013, Shenzhen, China
 Hong Kong Eye – Contemporary Hong Kong Art, published by Skira Editore S.p.A. 2012, Italy
 Beyond The Portrait, published by Leisure and Cultural Services Department 2012, Hong Kong
 Urban Utopia, Deutsche Bank Collection Hong Kong, published by Deutsche Bank AG, Frankfurt am Main 2011, Germany
 Legacy And Creations – Art Vs Art, published by the Leisure and Cultural Services Department of the Hong Kong SAR Government 2010, Hong Kong
 Hong Kong. City – Photo Exhibition at Shanghai Expo 2010, published by Hong Kong Institute of Professional Photographers Ltd, Hong Kong
 Imaging Hong Kong: Contemporary Photography Exhibition, published by pH5 Photo Group 2008, Hong Kong
 Nude Photography: The Art and the craft, published by Dorling Kindersley 2008, London, Great Britain
 Fabricated Mortals, exhibition catalogue, published by Osage Gallery 2007, Hong Kong
 Nude Bible, published by Tectum Publishers 2007, Belgium
 Qigong Meditation, text by Philip Marcovici, published by New Strategy Ltd, Hong Kong
 Photographing China – Highlight of 50 Years of Chinese Photography, published by China Photographic Publishing House 2006, 	Beijing, China
 Lianzhou International Photo Festival, published by Guangdong People’s Publishing House 2006, China
 Hong Kong Four Casts, published by Hong Kong University Press 2005, Hong Kong
 Hong Kong Art Biennial Exhibition 2005, published by the Leisure and Cultural Services Department 2005, Hong Kong
 Body Work, e-book, published by Ocean Pound, Toronto, Canada
 Nudes Index I, published by Konemann Verlagsgesellschaft mbH 2001, Cologne, Germany
 Life Still, exhibition catalogue, published by OP Foto Gallery 1999, Hong Kong
 Nudes 3, published by Graphis Inc. 2000, Swiss/US
 Ecco Homo, published by Vertigo Publishers 2000, Barcelona, Spain
 Almond Chu Photography, portfolio, published by Almond Chu Photography, Hong Kong
 Almond Chu Portraits - Asian Artists in New York, published by Anway Communications Co. 1994, Hong Kong
 Portrait of Life, exhibition catalogue, published by Antonio Mak and Almond Chu 1993, Hong Kong

References

External links
La Galerie, Paris 1839, Hong-Kong

Living people
1962 births
Chinese photographers
Hong Kong artists
Hong Kong photographers